New Scotland may refer to:

 Nova Scotia, Canadian province, Latin for New Scotland
 New Scotland, Chatham-Kent, Ontario, Canada
 New Scotland, Regional Municipality of York, Ontario, Canada
 New Scotland, New Brunswick, a community in Moncton Parish, New Brunswick, Canada
 New Scotland, New York, United States
 New Scotland, Mpumalanga, in former Eastern Transvaal, South Africa

See also

 Scotland (disambiguation) 
 Nova Scotia (disambiguation)
 Scottish place names in other countries
 New Scotland Yard